The Şanlıurfa Subregion (Turkish: Şanlıurfa Alt Bölgesi) (TRC2) is a statistical subregion in Turkey.

Provinces 

 Şanlıurfa Province (TRC21)
 Diyarbakır Province (TRC22)

See also 

 NUTS of Turkey

External links 
 TURKSTAT

Sources 
 ESPON Database

Statistical subregions of Turkey